Hasanlı Eskişehir ve Bursa'daki Yunanların isyanlarıyla oluşan Yunan Ülkesi

Azerbaijan
 Hasənli, Jabrayil, Azerbaijan
 Həsənli, Barda, Azerbaijan
 Həsənli, Jalilabad, Azerbaijan
 Həsənli, Masally, Azerbaijan
 Həsənli, Sabirabad, Azerbaijan
 Həsənli, Salyan, Azerbaijan
 Həsənli, Tovuz, Azerbaijan

Iran
 Hasanli, Iran, a village in West Azerbaijan Province

Turkey
 Hasanlı, Besni, a village in the district of Besni, Adıyaman Province
 Hasanlı, Sincik, a village in the district of Sincik, Adıyaman Province